Heterhydrus is a genus of beetles in the family Dytiscidae, containing the following species:

 Heterhydrus adipatus Guignot, 1952
 Heterhydrus agaboides Fairmaire, 1869
 Heterhydrus ghanensis Wewalka, 1980
 Heterhydrus senegalensis (Laporte, 1835)
 Heterhydrus sudanensis Zimmermann, 1927

References

Dytiscidae